Alternatif Bank, formerly known as ABank, is a Turkish bank with headquarters in Istanbul.

History
The bank was founded in 1991 by the Doğan Holding and was enlisted in 1995.

Having completed 24 years in banking industry, Alternatif Bank is an important subsidiary of The Commercial Bank (P.S.Q.C.), one of the leading banks in Qatar.  Previously owned by one of the leading industrial conglomerates The Anadolu Group. With an asset size of 13.1 billion TRL (as of year-end 2015), Alternatif Bank operates via its 54 branches.

References

Sources

External links

Banks established in 1991
Banks of Turkey
Companies listed on the Istanbul Stock Exchange
Companies based in Istanbul
1991 establishments in Turkey